The South End District is a historic district encompassing a portion of the South End neighborhood of Boston, Massachusetts.  It is bounded roughly by the Southwest Corridor Park on the northwest, the Massachusetts Turnpike to the north, Herald Street to the east, AlbanyStreet to the south east, and Massachusetts Avenue to the southwest.  The area's principal development took place 1850–73, and resulted in a neighborhood of what were originally single-family brick or brownstone rowhouses, interspersed with retail and civic buildings, as well as six small parks.  After the Panic of 1873 these properties were for the most part converted to multi-unit housing.

The district was listed on the National Register of Historic Places in 1973.  In 2014 it was expanded to include additional properties on the 200 block of Harrison Street.

See also
National Register of Historic Places listings in southern Boston, Massachusetts

References

Historic districts in Suffolk County, Massachusetts
South End, Boston
National Register of Historic Places in Boston
Historic districts on the National Register of Historic Places in Massachusetts